The Reluctant Romeo was a British television comedy series that was broadcast on the BBC in 1966 and 1967

Overview
The plot centres upon Geraldine Woods' (Amanda Barrie) obsession with an older working colleague, Thomas Jones (Leslie Crowther). Thomas Jones is already engaged to Sally Gardner (Margo Jenkins).

Episode status
All eight episodes of the show are thought to have been wiped.

References

External links
 

1960s British sitcoms
BBC television sitcoms
Lost BBC episodes
Lost television shows
1967 British television series debuts
1967 British television series endings
English-language television shows